Judith Lea Racusin is an American astrophysicist. She works at Goddard Space Flight Center as a research aerospace technologist in fields and particles. Racusin researches gamma-ray bursts, supernova remnants, high-energy astrophysics, and instrumentation.

Life and work 
Racusin completed a B.S. in astronomy, astrophysics, and general physics at University of Michigan College of Literature, Science, and the Arts in 2003. In 2009, Racusin earned a Ph.D. in astronomy and astrophysics at Pennsylvania State University. Her dissertation was titled The Collimation Signatures of Gamma-ray Bursts: Jet Properties and Energetics Inferred from X-ray Afterglow Observations. Her doctoral advisor was David N. Burrows.

In 2021, Racusin was officially listed as an Astronomy And Space Scientist working at the Goddard Space Flight Center in Greenbelt, Maryland.

References

External links 
 

Living people
Year of birth missing (living people)
American astrophysicists
NASA astrophysicists
21st-century American physicists
American women physicists
American women astronomers
21st-century American astronomers
21st-century American women scientists
NASA people
University of Michigan College of Literature, Science, and the Arts alumni
Eberly College of Science alumni